The men's javelin at the 2012 IPC Athletics European Championships was held at Stadskanaal Stadium from 24–29 July.

Medalists
Results given by IPC Athletics.

Results

F12/13

F33/34/52/53

F40

F42

F44

F54

F55/56

F57/58

See also
List of IPC world records in athletics

References

javelin throw
Javelin throw at the World Para Athletics European Championships